Qamar Jalalvi, (born Muhammad Husain and also known as Ustad Qamar Jalalvi) was a Pakistani poet. He was born in Jalali near Aligarh, India in 1887, and died on 4 October 1968. After the creation of Pakistan in 1947, he moved to Karachi.

Qamar Jalalvi is regarded as one of the best classical Urdu Ghazal poets. His ghazal poetry has unique simplicity of expression.

A poet from the age of eight, Qamar Jalalvi's writing had become quite popular by the time he was in his 20s.

He lived a life of financial hardship working for many years at bicycle repair shops. In India and Pakistan, a teacher of arts is known as Ustad (master), and the term is also loosely used to refer to any kind of skilled worker. Qamar Jalalvi was initially called Ustad because of his bicycle work. Popular with critics, for his mastery of poetry as well, they dubbed him Ustad Qamar Jalalvi, once his poetry became popular.

Ustad Qamar Jalalvi died in Karachi, Pakistan on 4 October 1968.

Books
The collections of ghazals include:

 Rashk-e Qamar (رشکِ قمَر)
 Auj-e Qamar (اَوجِ قمَر)
 Tajalliyat-e Qamar (تجلّیاتِ قمَر)
 Gham-e-Javedan (غمِ جاوِداں)
 Aaye Hain Woh Mazaar Pe
 Daba Ke Chal Diye Sab Qabr Mein

See also
Qamar Ajnalvi
Qamar Jalalabadi

References

External links
 Asha Bhosle sings Qamar Jalalvi on hindigeetmala.net website

1887 births
1968 deaths
Pakistani poets
People from Aligarh
Muhajir people
People from British India
Poets from Karachi
20th-century poets
Urdu-language poets from Pakistan